Terminal uridylyltransferase 7 (TUT7), also known as "zinc finger, CCHC domain containing 6", is an enzyme that in humans is encoded by the ZCCHC6 gene located on chromosome 9. The ZCCHC6 protein mediates the terminal uridylation of RNA transcripts with short poly-A tails and is involved in mRNA and microRNA degradation

Structure

The ZCCHC6 gene contains 33 exons with at least six known isoforms due to alternative splicing. The ZCCHC6 gene encodes for a protein that is 171 kDa in molecular weight and is localized to the cytoplasm.

Function 
It catalyzes the following reaction, requiring Mg2+ and Mn2+ as co-factors.

UTP + RNA(n) = diphosphate + RNA(n+1) 

Uridylation catalyzed by ZCCHC6 takes place readily on deadenylated mRNAs inside the cells. Purified ZZHC6 selectively recognizes and uridylates RNA molecules possessing short poly(A) tails (less than 25 nucleotides) in vitro.  In cells depleted of ZCCHC6, the majority of mRNAs lose the signature oligo(U) tails that are characteristic of ZCCHC6 reactivity, and the half-life of mRNA molecules are accordingly prolonged.

In addition to mRNA degradation, uridylation is also thought to function in pre-microRNA maturation, with some group II pre-microRNA requiring 3' mono-uridylation for Dicer processing. ZCCHC6 is thought to work in redundancy with ZCCHC11 to mediate the biogenesis of the let-7 microRNA through uridylation.

References

Further reading 

 
 
 
 

Human proteins